Duellman's pigmy leaf-toed gecko (Phyllodactylus duellmani), also known commonly as la salamanquesa pigmea de Duellman in Mexican Spanish, is a species of lizard in the family Phyllodactylidae. The species is endemic to Mexico.

Etymology
The specific name, duellmani, is in honor of American herpetologist William Edward Duellman.

Geographic range
P. duellmani is found in the Mexican state of Michoacán.

Habitat
The preferred natural habitat of P. duellmani is forest, where it has been found on tree branches and on rocks.

Reproduction
P. duellmani is oviparous.

References

Further reading
Dixon JR (1960). "Two New Geckos, Genus Phyllodactylus (Reptilia:Sauria), from Michoacan, Mexico". Southwestern Naturalist 5 (1): 37–42. (Phyllodactylus duellmani, new species, p. 37).
Dixon JR (1964). "The Systematics and Distribution of Lizards of the Genus Phyllodactylus in North and Central America". New Mexico State University Scientific Bulletin 64: 1–139. (Phyllodactylus duellmani, p. 97).
Ramírez-Reyes T, Blair C, Flores-Villela O, Piñero D, Lathrop A, Murphy R (2020). "Phylogenomics and molecular species delimitation reveals great cryptic diversity of leaf-toed geckos (Phyllodactylidae; Phyllodactylus), ancient origins, and diversification in Mexico". Molecular Phylogenetics and Evolution 150 (9): 1–18.
Rösler H (2000). "Kommentierte Liste der rezent, subrezent und fossil bekannten Geckotaxa (Reptilia: Gekkonomorpha)". Gekkota 2: 28–153. (Phyllodactylus duellmani, p. 104). (in German).

Phyllodactylus
Reptiles of Mexico
Reptiles described in 1960